The Oued Righ (also spelled Oued Rir', Oued Rirh, Wadi Righ) is a region of the northeastern Algerian Sahara. It includes a number of oases, the principal centre being Touggourt.  Some of these oases speak Oued Righ Berber.

Groundwater is used for irrigation in the region.

References 

Sahara